Ashman phenomenon, also known as Ashman beats, describes a particular type of wide QRS complex, often seen isolated that is typically seen in atrial fibrillation.  It is more often misinterpreted as a premature ventricular complex.

It is named for Richard Ashman (of New Orleans) (1890 –1969), after first being described by Gouaux and Ashman in 1947.

Presentation
Ashman beats are described as wide complex QRS complexes that follow a short R-R interval preceded by a long R-R interval.  This short QRS complex typically has a right bundle branch block morphology and represents an aberrantly conducted complex that originates above the AV node, rather than a complex that originates in either the right or left ventricle.

Cause
It occurs because the duration of the refractory period of  the myocardium is proportional to the R-R interval of the preceding cycle. A short R-R interval is associated with a shorter duration of action potential  and vice versa. A long R-R cycle will prolong the ensuing refractory period, and if a shorter cycle follows, the beat terminating the cycle is likely to be conducted aberrantly. Because the refractory period of the right bundle branch is longer than the left, the right bundle will still be in the refractory period when the supraventricular impulse reaches the His-Purkinje system, resulting in a complex with right bundle branch block morphology.

Prognosis
Clinically, it is often asymptomatic by itself and considered benign in nature.

See also 
 Atrial fibrillation
 Electrocardiogram

References

Further reading

External links 

Cardiac arrhythmia
Medical signs
Diseases named for discoverer